Final Days may refer to:

The Final Days, a 1976 book by Bob Woodward and Carl Bernstein
The Final Days (1989 film), a television movie adaptation of the book
The Final Days (2000 film), a short film produced by the White House
"Final Days", a song from DC Talk
"Final Days", a song by Jonathan Davis from Black Labyrinth
Final Days: Anthems for the Apocalypse, an album by The Plasmatics